The 1979 Southern Cross Rally, officially the Southern Cross International Rally was the fourteenth running of the Southern Cross Rally. The rally took place between the 13th and the 17th of October 1979. The event covered 2,733 kilometres from Sydney to Port Macquarie.  It was won by George Fury and Monty Suffern, driving a Datsun Stanza.

Results

References

Rally competitions in Australia
Southern Cross Rally
Southern Cross Rally